The Parville manuscript is a manuscript currently in possession of the UC Berkeley Music Library (catalogue number MS-778; full number US-BEM 778). Along with the Bauyn manuscript, it is one of the most important sources for French harpsichord music of the 17th century.

The manuscript was created at around 1670 and discovered in Italy in 1968. The front cover is inscribed "M. de Parville", hence the name. It contains around 150 pieces by French composers of the era, including Jean-Henri d'Anglebert, Jacques Champion de Chambonnières and Louis Couperin, and several anonymous works.

See also
 French baroque harpsichordists

Baroque music manuscript sources
Compositions for harpsichord